The Coalition for the Advancement of Jewish Education (CAJE), founded as the Coalition for Alternatives in Jewish Education, was a non-profit organization based in New York City. Its activities included an annual conference that draws more Jewish educators than any other similar event, advocacy for Jewish educators, various education-related publications, and more.  Its founding was the brainchild of Jerry Benjamin and Cherie Koller-Fox.

In 2009, CAJE closed. In 2010 a new organization called NewCAJE arose, led by founder Cherie Koller-Fox.

Conference 

CAJE's yearly CAJE conference drew between 1,000 and 2,000 Jewish educators from around the world.

Unlike other conferences of its size, the CAJE conference typically offered several hundred workshops over the course of only a few days.  The daily workshops were supplemented by evening keynote addresses and musical and theatrical entertainment.  In recent years, sub-conferences such as the "Consortium for the Future of the Jewish Family"  ran concurrently with the CAJE conference.

The first CAJE conference was held in August 1976 at Brown University. Around 350 people attended.

Due to its size and nature, the CAJE conference was generally held on a university campus.

The CAJE conference inspired similar conferences around the world, including the very popular Limmud conference in the United Kingdom.

Recent and future locations 
 2015: University of Hartford
 2014: Sinai Temple and UCLA Hillel
 2013: Nichols College
 2012: Montclair State University
 2011: American Hebrew Academy
 2010: A new organization called NewCAJE arose, led by founder Cherie Koller-Fox. The first conference was held at Gann Academy in Waltham, Massachusetts. It had 350 attendees, most notably 75 young professionals.
 2009: CAJE went out of business
 2009: Trinity University (CAJE 34) This conference was canceled due to the economic downturn on 9 January 2009 via email to all CAJE members.
 2008: University of Vermont (CAJE 33, chaired by Mel Birger-Bray and Joel M. Hoffman)
 2007: Washington University in St. Louis (CAJE 32, chaired by Peter Eckstein, co-chaired by Iris Schwartz)
 2006: Duke University (CAJE 31)
 2005: University of Washington (CAJE 30)
 2004: Hofstra University (CAJE 29)
 2003: Ohio State University (CAJE 28)
 2002: Trinity University (CAJE 27)
 2001: Colorado State University (CAJE 26)
 2000: Hofstra University (CAJE 25)

Highlights of CAJE 33 Aug 10–14 2008

The Future of Congregational Education: Evolution & Revolution<
The Roundtable Fishbowl
Green Judaism: The Moral Imperative to Care for the Earth
Early Childhood Conference @ CAJE 33: Sharing a Vision --- Early Childhood as the Gateway to Jewish Learning and Living
Hands-on Technology: Virtual Community, Actual Learning
Principals' Intensives
Teachers' Intensives
National Educators Institute with PANIM: The Institute for Jewish Leadership and Values

External links 
 NewCAJE
 CAJE 33
 CAJE 33 blog
CAJE closes

Jewish educational organizations
Jewish charities based in the United States
Charities based in New York City